Joseph A. Fabel (May 15, 1917 – January 31, 1967) was a professional basketball player. He spent one season in the Basketball Association of America (BAA) as a member of the Pittsburgh Ironmen. He attended the University of Pittsburgh.

BAA career statistics

Regular season

External links
 

1917 births
1967 deaths
American men's basketball players
Basketball players from Pittsburgh
Pittsburgh Ironmen players
Pittsburgh Panthers men's basketball players
Pittsburgh Pirates (NBL) players